The Orto Botanico Forestale dell'Abetone (1.4 hectares) is a botanical garden located in Fontana Vaccaia, Abetone Cutigliano, Province of Pistoia, Tuscany, central Italy. 

It is open daily in the warmer months. The garden was inaugurated in 1987, and currently managed by a consortium formed of the Tuscany Region, State Forestry Corps, Mountain Community dell'Appennino Pistoiese, and the Universities of Florence, Pisa and Siena.

It contains about 300 plant species native to the northern Apennine Mountains, including blueberry, gentian, saxifrage, lily, moss and lichen, orchid, primrose, as well as fir, beech, birch, spruce, and willow. Species of interest include Abies alba, Caltha palustris, Fagus sylvatica, Gentiana asclepiadea, Gentiana kochiana, Gentiana purpurea, Gentiana verna, Laburnum anagyroides, Sorbus aucuparia, Picea abies, Pinguicula leptoceras, and Viola palustris.

See also 

 List of botanical gardens in Italy

References 

 Comune di Abetone - Orto Botanico Forestale dell'Abetone
 Orto Botanico Forestale dell'Abetone - Ecomuseo della Montagna Pistoiese (Italian)
 Horti entry (Italian)
 BGCI entry
 Università degli Studi di Firenze - Inaugurazione Orto Botanico dell'Abetone (Italian)
 C. Miniati (editor), L'orto botanico forestale dell'Abetone: Un percorso vivente per la conoscenza dell'Alto Appennino Pistoiese, Pistoia, Provincia di Pistoia, 2002.

Botanical gardens in Italy
Province of Pistoia
University of Florence
University of Pisa
Gardens in Tuscany
Forestry in Italy